Irregular warfare (IW) is defined in United States joint doctrine as "a violent struggle among state and non-state actors for legitimacy and influence over the relevant populations." Concepts associated with irregular warfare are older than the term itself.

One of the earliest known uses of the term irregular warfare is in the 1986 English edition of "Modern Irregular Warfare in Defense Policy and as a Military Phenomenon" by former Nazi officer Friedrich August Freiherr von der Heydte. The original 1972 German edition of the book is titled "Der Moderne Kleinkrieg als Wehrpolitisches und Militarisches Phänomen". The German word "Kleinkrieg" is literally translated as "Small War." The word "Irregular," used in the title of the English translation of the book, seems to be a reference to non "regular armed forces" as per the Third Geneva Convention.

Another early use of the term is in a 1996 Central Intelligence Agency document by Jeffrey B. White. Major military doctrine developments related to IW were done between 2004 and 2007 as a result of the September 11 attacks on the United States. A key proponent of IW within US DoD is Michael G. Vickers, a former paramilitary officer in the CIA. The CIA's Special Activities Center (SAC) is the premiere American paramilitary clandestine unit for creating and for combating irregular warfare units. For example, SAD paramilitary officers created and led successful irregular units from the Hmong tribe during the war in Laos in the 1960s from the Northern Alliance against the Taliban during the war in Afghanistan in 2001 and from the Kurdish Peshmerga against Ansar al-Islam and the forces of Saddam Hussein during the war in Iraq in 2003.

Irregular warfare favors indirect warfare and asymmetric warfare approaches, though it may employ the full range of military and other capabilities, in order to erode the adversary's power, influence, and will. It is inherently a protracted struggle that will test the resolve of a state and its strategic partners. The distinction between regular and irregular forces is unrelated to the term "irregular warfare". The term, irregular warfare, was settled upon in distinction from "traditional warfare" and "unconventional warfare", and to differentiate it as such.

In an entry to the electronic open access Handbook of Military Sciences the Dutch military scholar Martijn Kitzen explores Operations in Irregular Warfare and the underlying body of knowledge which characterizes these conflicts as violent struggles involving non-state actors and states that seek to establish power, control, and legitimacy over relevant populations. In the chapter, Kitzen provides an overview of much of the academic literature that covers this field.

Other definitions
 IW is a form of warfare that has as its objective the credibility and/or legitimacy of the relevant political authority with the goal of undermining or supporting that authority. IW favors indirect approaches, though it may employ the full range of military and other capabilities to seek asymmetric approaches in order to erode an adversary's power, influence, and will.
 IW is defined as a violent struggle among state and non-state actors for legitimacy and influence over the relevant population(s)
 IW involves conflicts in which enemy combatants are not regular military forces of nation-states.
 IW is "war among the people" as opposed to "industrial war" (i.e., regular war).

Examples 
Nearly all modern wars include at least some element of irregular warfare. Since the time of Napoleon, approximately 80% of conflict has been irregular in nature.
However, the following conflicts may be considered to have exemplified by irregular warfare:

Afghan Civil War
Algerian War
American Indian Wars
American Revolutionary War
Arab Revolt
Chinese Civil War
Cuban Revolution
First Chechen War
First Sudanese Civil War
Iraq War
Kosovo War
Lebanese Civil War
Portuguese Colonial War
Rwanda Civil War
Second Boer War
Second Chechen War
Second Sudanese Civil War
Somali Civil War
Philippine-American War
The Troubles
Vietnam War
Libyan Civil War (2011)
Syrian Civil War
Iraqi Civil War (2014–2017)
Second Libyan Civil War
Yemeni Civil War (2015–present)

Activities 
Activities and types of conflict included in IW are:

 Asymmetric warfare
Civil-military operations (CMO)
Colonial war
Foreign internal defense (FID)
Guerrilla warfare (GW)
 Insurgency/Counter-insurgency (COIN)
Law enforcement activities focused on countering irregular adversaries
 Military Intelligence and counter-intelligence activities
Stabilization, Security, Transition, and Reconstruction Operations (SSTRO)
Terrorism/Counter-terrorism
 Transnational criminal activities that support or sustain IW:
 narco-trafficking
 Illicit arms trafficking
 illegal financial transactions
Unconventional warfare (UW)

According to the DoD, there are five core activities of IW:
 Counter-insurgency (COIN)
 Counter-terrorism (CT)
 Unconventional warfare (UW)
 Foreign internal defense (FID)
 Stabilization Operations (SO)

Modeling and simulation 
As a result of DoD Directive 3000.07, United States armed forces are studying irregular warfare concepts using modeling and simulation.

Wargames and exercises 
There have been several military wargames and military exercises associated with IW, including:

 Unified Action 
 Unified Quest 
 January 2010 Tri-Service Maritime Workshop,
 Joint Irregular Warrior Series war games,
 Expeditionary Warrior war game series, and
 a December 2011 Naval War College Maritime Stability Operations Game focused specifically on stability operations in the maritime domain conducted by the Naval Service.

See also 

 Civilian casualty ratio
 Endemic warfare
 Fourth-generation warfare
 Hague Conventions (1899 and 1907)
 Information warfare
 Irregular military
 Low-intensity conflict
 Political warfare
 Psychological operations
 Small Wars Journal
 The Troubles
 War on Terror
 War on Drugs

Individuals:

 Che Guevara
 François Géré
 John R. M. Taylor
 T. E. Lawrence
 Robert Rogers' 28 "Rules of Ranging"

Notes

References

External links

 Military Art and Science Major - Irregular Warfare Specialty Track  
 Pincus, Walter, "Irregular Warfare, Both Future and Present," The Washington Post, 7 April 2008 
 Phillips, Joan T., Fairchild, Muir S.,"Irregular Warfare", Maxwell Air Force Base, March 2007  
 Gustafson, Michael, "Modern Irregular Warfare & Counterinsurgency", Swedish National Defence College, 2009  
 Coons, Kenneth C. Jr., Harned, Glenn M., "Irregular Warfare is Warfare", Joint Force Quarterly, National Defense University, 2009  
 Naval Postgraduate School (NPS) Center on Terrorism and Irregular Warfare (CTIW) 
 United States Joint Forces Command (USJFCOM) Joint Irregular Warfare Center (JIWC)  
 Armed Groups and Irregular Warfare; Adapting Professional Military Education, Richard H. Shultz, Jr., Roy Godson, and Querine Hanlon (Washington, DC: National Strategy Information Center, 2009). 
 Tomkins, Paul, Irregular Warfare: Annotated Bibliography. Fort Bragg, NC: United States Army Special Operations Command, 2011.

Warfare by type
Military science
Military doctrines
Military strategy
Guerrilla warfare tactics